Mario Collazo (born August 8, 1978), better known by his stage name Planetary, is an American underground rapper from Philadelphia, Pennsylvania. He is one half of the rap duo OuterSpace and a member of Army of the Pharaohs.

Biography

Early career (1995-1999)
Planetary started rapping with high school friends Marcus Albaladejo and Richard Cruz. The trio later went on to form the group OuterSpace. The group originally started to form in the early 90s and eventually lead to an alliance with fellow Philadelphians Jedi Mind Tricks and their label Superegular Recordings. In 1998, Superegular released their debut single "We Lyve" which was met with critical praise for its complex, scientific rhymes and ethereal, seemingly other-worldly beats.
 	
Outerspace appeared on several JMT tracks and in 1999 the Illegaliens EP was released in on the Wordsound label. Soon thereafter, Outerspace hooked up with DJ SAT ONE and began recording with Jazzy Jeff's production company A Touch of Jazz. This collaboration proved fruitful with the release of the SAT ONE produced Danger Zone 12" on Soulspazm Records.

Blood and Ashes (2000-2004)
Crypt continued to work alongside as a rap duo with OuterSpace and appeared on Jedi Mind Tricks' albums through the early 2000s and became a part of Paz's supergroup Army of the Pharaohs. He was also featured on Army of the Pharaohs compilation album; Rare Shit, Collabos and Freestyles. In May 2004, Outerspace released Jedi Mind Tricks Presents Outerspace A collection of Outerspace's 12" and previously unreleased tracks from the Superegular label era, loyalists were treated to unreleased music, while new fans were given the chance to experience the tracks that established Outerspace's underground presence.  After OuterSpace moved with Jedi Mind Tricks over to Babygrande Records, they went on to release their debut studio album Blood and Ashes, in July 2004. The Album features collaborations by Jedi Mind Tricks member Vinnie Paz, Immortal Technique, Sadat X from Brand Nubian and fellow A.O.T.P. members 7L & Esoteric, Celph Titled, Des Devious & King Syze.

Blood Brothers, God's Fury and AOTP (2005-2010)
Planetary along with Crypt released Blood Brothers. Their third album which was released on September 5, 2006, by Babygrande Records. The album features guest appearances from Vinnie Paz of Jedi Mind Tricks, Sheek Louch and Royce da 5'9". The album's lead single is "Street Massacre" b/w "U Don't Like Me".

During this time Vinnie Paz added Planetary to the Army of the Pharaohs roster. A start of numerous releases for Planetary for the hip hop supergroup.The Torture Papers is the debut album by Army of the Pharaohs, released March 21, 2006 on Babygrande Records. The album also features Vinnie Paz, Chief Kamachi, 7L & Esoteric, Virtuoso and Bahamadia. Virtuoso and Bahamadia later split from the group, which now consists of Paz, Kamachi, 7L & Esoteric, Apathy, Crypt the Warchild, King Syze, Reef the Lost Cauze, Des Devious, Celph Titled and Faez One. An Army of the Pharaohs collaboration album was rumored to be in the works for years, but was often delayed due to separate projects and internal problems, however a mixtape titled After Torture There's Pain was released in 2007. Ritual of Battle  the second studio album by AOTP was released on September 25, 2007.

OuterSpaces' fourth release God's Fury, was released on September 30, 2008, by Babygrande Records. The album features collaborations by Jedi Mind Tricks member Vinnie Paz, Sick Jacken & Cynic of Psycho Realm, and fellow A.O.T.P. members Doap Nixon, Reef The Lost Cauze, Des Devious, King Syze, Celph Titled, and Chief Kamachi.

My Brothers Keeper and Lost in Space (2011-2015)
My Brothers Keeper  is the fourth studio album from underground hip hop duo OuterSpace, released on August 23, 2011 by Enemy Soil. The album features collaborations by Vinnie Paz, Ill Bill, Doap Nixon, Apathy, Blacastan, Esoteric, Sick Jacken, King Syze and Zilla.

Discography

OuterSpace
 2004: Jedi Mind Tricks Presents: OuterSpace
 2004: Blood and Ashes
 2006: Blood Brothers
 2008: God's Fury
 2011: My Brother's Keeper
 2015: Lost in Space
 TBA (with Brutal Music) (TBA)

Army of the Pharaohs
 2006: The Torture Papers
 2007: Ritual of Battle
 2010: The Unholy Terror 
 2014: In Death Reborn
 2014: Heavy Lies the Crown

References

American male rappers
Army of the Pharaohs members
Living people
Rappers from Philadelphia
Underground rappers
21st-century American rappers
1978 births
21st-century American male musicians